The Malcolm Knapp Research Forest is located in the Coast Mountains, about 60 km from Vancouver, in Maple Ridge, British Columbia. The forest is approximately 5,157 hectares and has many different types of terrain. The forest is home to some 400-year-old trees, though the vast majority of trees are 70–120 years old. It was a site of major logging from the 1800s to 1931, but was officially established as the UBC/Malcolm Knapp Research Forest in 1949 because of the major influence from the late UBC professor Malcolm Knapp. Although today it is dedicated to research and education, it is also a popular destination for trail hiking and camps.



Historic influence and UBC research

In 1922 when the forestry program at UBC was just two years old, Malcolm Knapp, a professor of forestry, had a vision to conduct research for forestry. He taught courses on logging, wood technology and forestry products. At this time, the university only had a small forest on the edge of campus for research, so his influence was immense when the University of British Columbia took over management of the forest in 1949. His vision of having a large and vast forest became reality. This vision, along with his passion for salvaging and silviculture for the Forestry Program at UBC, was of great importance as his 41 years of service for the university ended in 1963. After his many years of service to the forest and the university, the Research Forest officially changed its name to Malcolm Knapp/UBC Research Forest in 1988, and then he died a year later.

UBC also holds a spot at the top of one of the mountains for a liquid mirror telescope observatory (UBC LMTO). It was established in 1995 as part of the development of liquid-mirror technology. The telescope overlooks the Fraser Valley and is far enough away from the city lights to provide a great research facility.

There are currently 84 research projects going on at the forest, all related to riparian management, silviculture, wildlife, hydrology, ecology, and other applied science fields.  Research in the forest for the past decade has seen a shift from projects looking at maximizing growth and yields in managed forests to the ecological impacts different forestry practices has on the forest. UBC also releases annual reports in which one can see what is going on in the forest, what research they are conducting, and any updates on projects. Staff changes, silviculture reports (including clear-cuts, thinning, etc.), along with major events for the forest are all summarized in these reports. Please see external links for archives.

Ecology

It measures 13 km from west to east and 4 km north to south. It contains every type of terrain found on Coastal B.C which means that it has a wide variety of many plants, animals and trees. The highest elevation is in the north-east corner and is about 1000m above sea level in the Golden Ears Mountains, and it spans down to sea level, touching Pitt Lake. Typically, the most precipitation that is seen at the forest is rain, which averages about 2200mm in the northern end of the forest. This end also receives snow in the winter. However, the south end is closer to sea level and receives around 3000mm of rain per year.

Malcolm Knapp Research Forest is categorized in the Coast Western Hemlock Biogeoclimatic zone, with the lower portion of the forest in the dry maritime subzone and the upper portion in the very wet maritime subzone. It has a vast collection of trees, plants and animals including Douglas fir, western red cedar, western hemlock and amabilis fir trees. The forest still has some patches of intact old growth forest that is over 400 years old, but since ongoing research is being done, some of the forest is as young as 40 years old, though most of the forest is covered in trees that are about 70 years old. Some other trees and plants you can find are bigleaf maple, vine maple, skunk cabbage (yellow flower pictured beside), Oregon grape, salmonberry, and many ferns like sword fern and spiny wood fern.

Recreation

The maximum trail length is about 8 km; that will take the average hiker around 3 hours to walk. The trails at Malcolm Knapp are categorized as an intermediate hike.

South Malcolm Knapp hiking

The south part of Malcolm Knapp Research Forest has an abundance of trails which are all colour coded into Red, Green, Yellow, and blue, with red being the easiest and blue being the hardest. Please see external links for a map of the trails.

Loon Lake hiking
The Loon Lake Trail is for guests of Loon Lake Research and Education Centre wishing to embark on this 6 km hike. Please see external links for a map of the trails.

Loon Lake Research and Education Centre

On the trails at Loon Lake there is a research and education centre. Loon Lake is the largest lake in the forest, and has its own trail around the lake that will take about 6 hours to complete as it is 6 km in length. The lake opened an outdoor education camp in 2000, and now provides an area for forestry and environmental education, as well as outdoor recreation with activities such as:

 Canoe & Water Adventures
 SKY Helicopter Tours
 Eco-Tours and Hiking
 Inspired Learning educational programs
 Pinnacle Pursuits
 Rock-climbing, rappelling, high/low ropes, team building

Camp Goodtimes
Loon Lake also houses Camp Goodtimes, a summer recreation program for children and teens affected by cancer and their families. It is divided into six weeks throughout July and August: four weeks for kids' camp, one week for teen, and one week for family. It is held at Loon Lake at no cost to participants. Camp Goodtimes is accredited by the British Columbia Camping Association and the Canadian Association of Pediatric Oncology Camps (CAPOC).

See also
 Pacific Spirit Regional Park, operated by MetroVancouver and separates UBC from the City of Vancouver
 Alex Fraser Research Forest, another one of UBC's research forests
 Alouette Lake, a lake near Malcolm Knapp Forest
 Large Zenith Telescope, a former liquid mirror telescope in the Malcolm Knapp Forest

References

External links
 UBC Forestry Webpage

University of British Columbia
Maple Ridge, British Columbia
Forestry education
1949 establishments in British Columbia
Forests of British Columbia